Huallatane (possibly from Aymara wallata snow ball, snow lump / Andean goose, -ni a suffix to indicate ownership, "the one with a snow ball", "the one with a snow lump" or "the one with the Andean goose") is a mountain in the Chila mountain range in the Andes of Peru, about  high. It is situated in the Arequipa Region, Caylloma Province, Tapay District. Huallatane lies north of the Colca Canyon, north-west of the mountain Surihuiri.

References 

Mountains of Peru
Mountains of Arequipa Region